Turkmenistan competed at the 2020 Winter Youth Olympics in Lausanne, Switzerland from 9 to 22 January 2020. This was also the first time that Turkmenistan competed at the Winter Youth Olympic Games.

Turkmenistan made its Winter Youth Olympics debut.

Ice hockey

Mixed NOC 3x3 tournament 

Boys
Nowruz Baýhanow

See also
Turkmenistan at the 2020 Summer Olympics

References

Nations at the 2020 Winter Youth Olympics
Turkmenistan at the Youth Olympics